The 2005 Munster Senior Hurling Championship Final (sponsored by Guinness) was a hurling match played on Sunday 26 June 2005 at Páirc Uí Chaoimh, Cork, County Cork,. It was contested by Cork and Tipperary. Cork captained by Seán Óg Ó hAilpín claimed the title beating Tipperary on a scoreline of 1-21 to 1-16.
The match was shown live in Ireland as part of the Sunday Game live on RTÉ Two.

Match details

References

Munster
Munster Senior Hurling Championship Finals
Cork county hurling team matches
Tipperary GAA matches